Ahmet Mithat Berberoğlu (8 April 1921 – 4 April 2002) was a Turkish Cypriot politician and the founder of the Republican Turkish Party. He was born on May 8, 1921 in Limassol. He studied at Istanbul University Law School and studied law in London. In the elections of the House of Representatives held on 31 July 1960, he was able to enter the 1st House of Representatives of the Republic of Cyprus as a member of Kyrenia. The Assembly of the Republic on 5 July 1970 elected to parliament again. About five months later, on December 27, 1970, he founded the Republican Turkish Party, becoming the party's first leader. On the 13th of February 1975, as the deputy came to an end, one year later Özker Özgür became the party leader.

He died on April 4, 2002. He was married and had a child.

References

1921 births
Leaders of political parties in Northern Cyprus
20th-century Cypriot lawyers
Turkish Cypriot political writers
People from Limassol
Cypriot people of the Cyprus Emergency
2002 deaths
Istanbul University Faculty of Law alumni
Turkish Cypriot expatriates in Turkey
Turkish Cypriot expatriates in the United Kingdom